Harpalus turmalinus is a species of ground beetle in the subfamily Harpalinae. It was described by Wilhelm Ferdinand Erichson in 1847.

References

turmalinus
Beetles described in 1847